2 Compositions is an EP by Peter Frohmader, released independently in 1983.

Track listing

Personnel
Adapted from the 2 Compositions liner notes.
 Peter Frohmader – synthesizer
 Stephan Manus – violin (A-side)

Release history

References

External links 
 2 Compositions at Discogs (list of releases)

1983 EPs
Peter Frohmader albums